John Clavering is the name of:

John Clavering (c. 1364–1425), MP for Northumberland (UK Parliament constituency)
 John Clavering (died 1762) (1698–1762), Member of Parliament for Great Marlow, and for Penryn
 John Clavering (British Army officer) (died 1777), army officer and diplomat
Sir John Clavering, 3rd Baronet (1672–1714), of the Clavering baronets

See also
Clavering (surname)